John Stuart Williams (July 10, 1818July 17, 1898) was a general in the Confederate States Army during the American Civil War, and a postbellum Democratic U.S. Senator from Kentucky.

Early life and career
Born near Mount Sterling, Kentucky, Williams attended the common schools and graduated from Miami University in Oxford, Ohio, in 1839. He studied law, was admitted to the bar in 1840, and commenced practice in Paris, Kentucky. He served in the Mexican–American War, first as a captain of an independent company attached to the 6th U.S. Infantry, and afterward as a colonel of the Fourth Regiment of the Kentucky Volunteers. He received the nickname "Cerro Gordo Williams" for his gallantry at that battle.

Williams was a member of the Kentucky House of Representatives in 1851 and 1853. He became known as a leading proponent of states rights. He was initially an anti-secessionist, but abhorred President Abraham Lincoln's policies and cast his lot with the Confederacy.

Civil War
With the outbreak of hostilities, Williams travelled to Prestonburg in early 1861 and was commissioned colonel of the 5th Kentucky Infantry. He served initially in the Eastern Theater, initially under Humphrey Marshall in southwestern Virginia. He participated in Marshall's ill-fated invasion of eastern Kentucky in 1862; and fought for Marshall at the victory at the Battle of Princeton Court House. Marshall resigned soon thereafter and was sent to eastern Tennessee. Williams' brigade then spent a short period of time fighting for William W. Loring in the Kanawha Valley Campaign of 1862, skirmishing at Fayetteville and reaching Charleston. Loring was then transferred to the Mississippi, replaced by John Echols. He was promoted to brigadier general in late 1862 and assigned temporary command of the Department of Southwestern Virginia, replacing Echols.  He was replaced by General Samuel Jones.

He organized a brigade of cavalry and helped resist Ambrose Burnside's invasion of eastern Tennessee in the autumn of 1863, participating in the Battle of Blue Springs. He resigned that command and transferred to Georgia, assuming command of the Kentucky regiments in the cavalry of Joseph Wheeler in June 1864. He received a formal resolution of thanks from the Second Confederate Congress in the fall of 1864 for his actions at the Battle of Saltville. He surrendered in 1865.

Postbellum
Williams returned home following the war and went on to engage in agricultural pursuits, with his residence in Winchester, Kentucky.

He again became a member of the State House in 1873 and 1875. He ran unsuccessfully for Governor of Kentucky in 1875, and was a presidential elector on the Democratic ticket in 1876. He was elected to the United States Senate in 1879 and served from March 4, 1879 to March 3, 1885. He failed in his reelection bid and returned to his agricultural pursuits.

Williams became involved in land development in Florida in the late 1880s. Along with a partner, Louisville businessman Walter N. Haldeman, the publisher of the Louisville Courier-Journal; they founded the town of Naples, Florida.

He died in Mount Sterling in 1898 and was interred in Winchester Cemetery in Winchester.

See also

 List of American Civil War generals (Confederate)

Notes

References

 Eicher, John H., and David J. Eicher, Civil War High Commands. Stanford: Stanford University Press, 2001. .
 The Latin Library
 Sifakis, Stewart. Who Was Who in the Civil War. New York: Facts On File, 1988. .
 Warner, Ezra J. Generals in Gray: Lives of the Confederate Commanders. Baton Rouge: Louisiana State University Press, 1959. .

External links
 

1818 births
1898 deaths
American military personnel of the Mexican–American War
Confederate States Army generals
Democratic Party United States senators from Kentucky
Kentucky lawyers
Members of the Aztec Club of 1847
Democratic Party members of the Kentucky House of Representatives
Miami University alumni
People from Mount Sterling, Kentucky
People of Kentucky in the American Civil War
1876 United States presidential electors
19th-century American politicians
19th-century American lawyers